Monte Camicia is a mountain straddling the border between the province of Teramo and the province of L'Aquila in the Abruzzo region of Italy. It is part of the Gran Sasso d'Italia mountain chain.

References

Mountains of Abruzzo
Mountains of the Apennines
Two-thousanders of Italy